Mantoux may refer to:

 Charles Mantoux (1877–1947), French physician
 Étienne Mantoux (1913–1945), French economist
 Paul Mantoux (1877–1956), French historian
 Mantoux test, a method of testing for tuberculosis